Tat or TAT may refer to:

Geography
Tát, a Hungarian village
Tat Ali, an Ethiopian volcano

People
Tat, a son and disciple of Hermes Trismegistus
Tiffani Amber Thiessen, initials T.A.T.
Tat Wood, a British author

Arts, entertainment, and media
TAT (band), a punk/rock band from London, England
Die Tat, a former magazine

Aviation
TAT, the IATA Airport code of Poprad-Tatry Airport
TAT European Airlines, a former French regional airline
Total air temperature, sometimes referred to as Stagnation Temperature
Transcontinental Air Transport, a former US airline

Enterprises and organizations
Takraw Association of Thailand (TAT), a sport governing body of Thailand.
Tat Bank, a bank based in Tehran, Iran 
The Astonishing Tribe (or TAT), the former name of the Swedish company Research In Motion
Truckers Against Trafficking (or TAT), a nonprofit organization

Ethnology
Armeno-Tats, a subgroup of Armenians in the South Caucasus that speak the Tat language, a Southwestern Iranian language, a branch of Persian language
Juhuri language, the Jewish Tat language
Mountain Tats (Crimea), a mountain-dwelling subethnos of the Crimean Tatars
Tat people (Caucasus), an Iranian people of Persian origin from the Caucasus
Tat language (Caucasus), a Southwestern Iranian language, a branch of Persian language
Tat people (Iran), an Iranian ethnic group from Iran
Tati language (Iran), a Northwestern Iranian language
The Three Affiliated Tribes (TAT), a Northern Plains Native American tribe also known as the Mandan, Hidatsa, and Arikara Nation

Science, medicine and psychology
Tat (HIV), Trans-Activator of Transcription, HIV protein
Tapas Acupressure Technique, an alternative medicine therapy
Targeted alpha-particle therapy, radiation therapy for cancer
Thematic apperception test, a projective psychological test
Thrombin–antithrombin complex, a protein complex
Tropine acyltransferase, an enzyme
Twin-arginine translocation pathway, cellular protein export pathway
Tyrosine aminotransferase, an enzyme encoded by the TAT gene
 TAT, a codon for the amino acid Tyrosine

Other uses
Tat, verb for the action of making lace, see Tatting
Tat, short for tattoo
Tat Tvam Asi, a Hindu philosophical concept
Transatlantic telephone cable
Turnaround time

See also
Tati (disambiguation)

Language and nationality disambiguation pages

azb:تات (دقیقلشدیرمه)
de:TAT
fa:تات
fi:TAT
fr:TAT
it:TAT
ja:TAT
nl:TAT
pl:TAT
pt:TAT
ru:TAT
sh:TAT
sr:TAT
zh:TAT